Charles Knight MD FRCP OBE is a British professor of cardiology and chief executive of St Bartholomew's Hospital, part of Barts Health NHS Trust.

In 1994 he assisted in the first percutaneous alcohol septal ablation, a non-surgical method for the treatment of hypertrophic obstructive cardiomyopathy as an alternative to open heart surgery, and subsequently specialised in the procedure. From 2010 he led the development of the Barts Heart Centre at Barts Health NHS Trust which opened in 2015 by merging cardiac services from the London Chest Hospital, The Heart Hospital and St Bartholomew's Hospital. 

In 2020, Knight was appointed chief executive officer of NHS Nightingale Hospital London, established to care for people during the COVID-19 pandemic. In the same year he was awarded an OBE for services to the NHS and people with heart disease.

He is on the list of honorary medical staff at the private King Edward VII's Hospital.

Education
Charles Knight trained at Cambridge and Oxford universities.

Career
In 1994, at the Royal Brompton Hospital, he assisted Ulrich Sigwart with the introduction of percutaneous alcohol septal ablation, a non-surgical method for the treatment of hypertrophic obstructive cardiomyopathy, as an alternative to open heart surgery. Knight subsequently specialised in the procedure.

From 2010 he led the development of the Barts Heart Centre at Barts Health NHS Trust which opened in 2015 by merging cardiac services from the London Chest Hospital, The Heart Hospital and St Bartholomew's Hospital to create one of the largest cardiac centres in Europe. In 2015 he was appointed as managing director and then chief executive of St Bartholomew’s Hospital.

In March 2020, Knight was appointed chief executive officer of NHS Nightingale Hospital London, established to care for people during the COVID-19 pandemic. It was built in nine days with a 4,000 bed capacity. The following month, at a Royal Society of Medicine webinar, he stated his concern over the aversion of some people to seek medical attention for problems unrelated to COVID-19. In April 2021, following Prince Phillip's discharge from Barts, Knight received flowers from the Queen, on behalf of staff at Barts on the anniversary of the first COVID-19 lockdown.

Other roles
He was associate editor of the journal Heart until 2014, and chair of the London Cardiology Speciality Training Committee. He was a member of the Royal College of Physicians Cardiology Speciality Advisory Committee. From 2008 to 2011 he served as honorary secretary of the British Cardiovascular Society, where he had also been a member of its training committee.

He is a trustee of Barts Heritage, Fellow of the Royal College of Physicians, and is an honorary professor at the William Harvey Research Institute at Queen Mary University of London. Knight works at the private King Edward VII's Hospital.

Awards
In July 2020, he received the Freedom of the City of London for his work during the COVID-19 pandemic. In October 2020, he was awarded an OBE for services to the NHS and people with heart disease.

Selected publications
He has published over 100 research papers.

Articles
 (Co-author)
 (Co-author)
 (Co-author)
 (Co-author)
 (Co-author)

See also
List of honorary medical staff at King Edward VII's Hospital for Officers

References

Further reading

External links 
 Video of Knight addressing St. Bart's staff about COVID-19

Living people
Year of birth missing (living people)
British cardiologists
Alumni of the University of Cambridge
Alumni of the University of Oxford
Academics of Queen Mary University of London
National Health Service people
Fellows of the Royal College of Physicians
British chief executives
Place of birth missing (living people)